Khazal Al Majidi (born 1951 in Kirkuk, Iraq) is an Iraqi Assyriologist, academic, author and researcher who specializes in the science and history of ancient religions and civilizations. He is also a poet and playwright. Khazal Alamjidi has more than 50 works that vary between the science of religions and civilizations, poetry, and plays, most of which are written in Arabic. Much of his work has been translated into English, French, Spanish, Persian and Kurdish

Biography 
Al-Majidi was born in Kirkuk, Iraq, in 1951. He completed his studies in Baghdad and obtained a doctorate in ancient history from the Institute of Arab History for Graduate Studies in Baghdad in 1996. He also received a second doctorate in the philosophy of religions in 2009.

Career 
Al-Majidi worked in the Department of Cinema and Theater in the Iraqi Ministry of Culture until 1998. He worked between 1973-and 1996 in radio, television, magazines, Iraqi newspapers, the Union of Writers and Writers, and the Department of Cinema and Theater. Then, Khazal worked as a professor at the University of Derna in Libya from 1998-to 2003, teaching ancient and art history. Moreover, he worked in Jordan and published his first intellectual books between 1996-and 1998.

In August 2003, Khazal returned to Iraq and served as Director of the Iraqi Center for Dialogue of Civilizations and Religions. Furthermore, between 2007-and 2014, he lectured at Leiden University and worked in several open universities in the Netherlands and Europe, and he taught the history of ancient civilizations and religions. He is also a member of the Union of Writers in Iraq, the Union of Arab Writers and the Union of Iraqi Playwrights, the Iraqi Journalists Syndicate, the Union of Arab Historians, and a member of the International Academy of East-West in Romania. He is a theatrical author and the author of more than fifty books on mythology (The Eternal Return: A Return to Origins and the Conflict of Myth and History) published by the Arab House of Encyclopaedias in 2011. Ancient history, ancient religions, poetry, theater, history of religions, science, and history of civilizations.

Publications

Mythology, ancient religions, and civilizations

Poetry

Plays

Poetic theories 
 (The Poetic Reason) Book One (The Pure Poetic Reason and the Speaking Ocean) Issued by the House of Cultural Affairs, Baghdad 2004.
 (The Poetic Reason) The second book (The Practical, Outward and Inward Poetic Reason) was published by the House of Cultural Affairs, Baghdad 2004.

See also 
 Donny George Youkhanna
 Taha Baqir
Hormuz Rassam

References 

People from Kirkuk
Iraqi religion academics
Iraqi dramatists and playwrights
20th-century Iraqi historians
21st-century Iraqi historians
20th-century Iraqi poets
21st-century Iraqi poets
Living people
1951 births
Assyriologists
Iraqi Assyriologists